Yasnogorsk is a town and the administrative center of Yasnogorsky District in Tula Oblast, Russia, located on the Vashana River (Oka's tributary),  north of Tula, the administrative center of the oblast. Population:

History
The village of Laptevo has been known since 1578-1579. It was granted urban-type settlement status in 1938 and town status in 1958. It was given its present name in 1965.

Administrative and municipal status
Within the framework of administrative divisions, Yasnogorsk serves as the administrative center of Yasnogorsky District. As an administrative division, it is incorporated within Yasnogorsky District as Yasnogorsk Town Under District Jurisdiction. As a municipal division, Yasnogorsk Town Under District Jurisdiction is incorporated within Yasnogorsky Municipal District as Yasnogorsk Urban Settlement.

Economy
The Yasnogorsk Machine-Building Factory builds parts for wagons, pumps, and locomotives for Russia's mining industry. The factory opened in 1895; along with jobs, the factory provided social services; in 1991 the factory owners gradually cut back on these services. In 2009, fewer than 280 workers were employed, from a peak of 7,000.

The town lags behind other urban centers of the oblast both economically and socially and its population has been steadily declining.

References

Sources

Notes

Cities and towns in Tula Oblast